Kim Yeong-jin (born 6 September 1955) is a South Korean sports shooter. He competed in the mixed skeet event at the 1984 Summer Olympics.

References

1955 births
Living people
South Korean male sport shooters
Olympic shooters of South Korea
Shooters at the 1984 Summer Olympics
Place of birth missing (living people)
Shooters at the 1978 Asian Games
Shooters at the 1986 Asian Games
Asian Games medalists in shooting
Asian Games silver medalists for South Korea
Medalists at the 1978 Asian Games
Medalists at the 1986 Asian Games
20th-century South Korean people
21st-century South Korean people